Halsted's principles, also known as Tenets of Halsted, are the basic principles of surgical technique  regarding tissue handling.

These key points were introduced in the late 19th century by William Stewart Halsted, co-founder of Johns Hopkins Hospital.

Gentle handling of tissue
Meticulous haemostasis
Preservation of blood supply
Strict aseptic technique
Minimum tension on tissues
Accurate tissue apposition
Obliteration of deadspace

References

Surgery